WGN may refer to:

 WGN (AM), a radio station (720 AM) licensed to Chicago, Illinois, United States
 WGN America, a cable television network that used this initialism within electronic guide listings prior to becoming NewsNation.

Broadcast call sign disambiguation pages